Dorio may refer to:

People
 Gabriella Dorio (born 1957), Italian athlete and Olympic gold winner
 Julian Dorio (born 1981), American drummer

Places
 Dorio, Lombardy, Italy
 Dorio, Messenia, Greece
 Dorio or Doron, Turkey

Other
 Dori'o language